John Pruen Cordner (20 March 1929  – 10 December 2016) was an Australian sportsman who played first-class cricket for Victoria and Australian rules football in the Victorian Football League (VFL) with Melbourne.

Born in Diamond Creek, Victoria, Cordner came from a famous Australian rules football family with three brothers, Don, Denis and Ted all having noted careers for the Melbourne Football Club. John spent just one season with Melbourne, in 1951, and played six VFL games.

Unlike his brothers, John excelled at cricket and made his first-class debut for Victoria in the 1951/52 Sheffield Shield season. Playing against Queensland at Brisbane he dismissed both openers, Leyland Sanders and Wally Grout, with his left-arm fast-medium bowling to finish with figures of 2 for 37 in the first innings. Despite playing another three first-class matches he only managed to take one further wicket. The last of those matches was for English side Warwickshire when they took on the touring Indian cricket team. He was in England at the time studying nuclear science. He played 34 district cricket matches for University, and took 80 wickets at 22.1.

He died in December 2016.

See also
 List of Victoria first-class cricketers

References

External links

 John Cordner at Demonwiki.
Cricinfo profile

1929 births
2016 deaths
Melbourne Football Club players
Australian cricketers
Victoria cricketers
Warwickshire cricketers
Cricketers from Melbourne
Australian rules footballers from Melbourne
People from Diamond Creek, Victoria